Tunisia, participated at the 1991 All-Africa Games held in Cairo, Egypt. She won 20 medals.

Medal summary

Medal table

See also
 Tunisia at the All-Africa Games

References

1991 All-Africa Games
1991
1991 in Tunisian sport